Ahmed Rubaai is an electrical engineer at Howard University in Washington, DC. He was named a Fellow of the Institute of Electrical and Electronics Engineers (IEEE) in 2015 for his contributions to the development of high-performance controls for motor drives.

References 

Fellow Members of the IEEE
Living people
Howard University faculty
21st-century American engineers
Year of birth missing (living people)
American electrical engineers